Leko may refer to:

 Leko (surname)
 Leko languages, a small group of African Savanna languages
 Leco language, a moribund isolate language of Bolivia
 Lekolite or Leko, a type of stage spotlight
 Alexandro da Silva Santos or Leko, Brazilian footballer
 Leko (Arnarvon Islands), a minor island in the Arnarvon Islands

See also 
 Lekos (Dagestan), the ancestor-eponym of the Lek tribe of the North Caucasus
 Lecco, a town in Lombardy, Italy